Konstantinos Kallimanis (born 13 February 1976) is a retired Greek football defender.

References

1976 births
Living people
Greek footballers
Levadiakos F.C. players
Proodeftiki F.C. players
Xanthi F.C. players
Aris Thessaloniki F.C. players
Panserraikos F.C. players
Pierikos F.C. players
Rodos F.C. players
Iraklis Psachna F.C. players
Chalkida F.C. players
Association football defenders
Super League Greece players
People from Euboea (regional unit)
Footballers from Central Greece